Babis Spur is a rocky spur in the southern part of the Nash Range, about  west of Cape Wilson. It was mapped by the United States Geological Survey from tellurometer surveys and from Navy air photos, 1960–62, and named by the Advisory Committee on Antarctic Names for William A. Babis, a United States Antarctic Research Program  oceanographer on the USCGC Eastwind, 1962–63, and on the USS Burton Island, 1963–64.

References 

Ridges of the Ross Dependency
Shackleton Coast